Law College Dhanbad  is a college imparting legal education in Dhanbad, Jharkhand, India established in 1976. It is affiliated to Binod Bihari Mahto Koyalanchal University, Dhanbad. This college is also approved by the Bar Council of India.

Courses 
The college offers a five-years integrated B.A. LL.B. (Hons.) course and three-years LL.B. course.

See also
Education in India
Literacy in India
List of law schools in India
List of institutions of higher education in Jharkhand

References

External links 
 http://www.lawcollegedhanbad.ac.in/aboutus.php

Law schools in Jharkhand
Education in Dhanbad
Educational institutions established in 1976
1976 establishments in Bihar
Colleges affiliated to Binod Bihari Mahto Koyalanchal University